Hamburg Historic District may refer to:

Hamburg Historic District (Davenport, Iowa)
Hamburg Historic District (Hamburg, Pennsylvania)